Owuraku Ampofo is a Ghanaian sports journalist and writer known for his use of data in journalism. He is former presenter of Prime Sport on Joy News and the current sports anchor at TV3 Ghana.

Early life and education 
Owuraku Ampofo was born in Ghana where he grew up. He studied journalism at Ashesi University. He is also an alumnus of Presbyterian Boys' Secondary School where he had his high school education.

Career 
Owuraku started out a footballer, playing in the third division with Koans FC, and in the Ashesi League during his tertiary education. In 2018, he began writing for sport start ups including Ghana Fans blog, he then became a writer at Sportskeeda before he interned and started out fully as a sports journalist at Joy FM (Ghana) in 2017. Owuraku resigned from his role as host of Prime Sport at Joy News in 2022 to join TV3 Ghana the same year.

Recognition 
In 2019, he was listed as one of the top 100 young Journalists in the World by the British Council. He also won the Ubora Sports Man of the Year during his time at Ashesi University. In 2021, Owuraku was announced as one of Avance Media's 50 Most Influential Young Ghanaians.

In 2022, Owuraku Ampofo was named Sports Influencer of the year 2022 at the Pulse Influencer Awards.

References

External links 
 

Living people
Ghanaian radio journalists
Ghanaian sports journalists
Ghanaian sportswriters
Ghanaian television journalists
1996 births